The Lindemann Performing Arts Center is a performing and visual arts facility under construction at Brown University in Providence, Rhode Island. The building is located at 130 Angell Street on Brown's main campus in the city's College Hill neighborhood. The Lindemann Center and adjacent Perry and Marty Granoff Center for the Creative Arts are both utilized by the Brown Arts Institute. The Arts Center is named for benefactor Frayda Lindemann and her husband George Lindemann.

Architecture 
Designed by REX, the building features a main hall that physically adapts to accommodate a variety of performance configurations, in a manner similar to that of the firm's Wyly Theatre. The Lindemann Center contains Brown's largest performance venue, with the main hall accommodating up to 625 seats in its most expanded configuration.

Construction 
REX revealed the building's design in February 2019; construction on the building began later that year. Freeing up space for the structure's site required the relocation of a historic Victorian duplex from 130-132 Angell Street to a new site along Brown Street. Movement of the historic house was completed in 2018.

The Lindemann Performing Arts Center was topped off in December 2020. The venue is scheduled to open in Fall 2023.

Gallery

References 

Performing arts centers in Rhode Island
Buildings and structures in Providence, Rhode Island
University and college arts centers in the United States
2023 establishments in Rhode Island